Edo State University, Uzairue (abbreviated EDSU) is a state government-owned tertiary institution founded in 2016. It is located in Iyamho, a town in Etsako West local government area of Edo State, Nigeria. On 23 March 2016, the university was approved by the National Universities Commission as Nigeria's 41st state university. Edo State University offer undergraduate, postgraduate and research programmes.

History
On 27 March 2014, the Edo State House of Assembly passed a bill for the establishment of a University of Science and Technology at Uzairue. The university was however changed to Edo University and its location to Iyamho.

Ranking and achievement 
In 2018, the university was  ranked first among State government owned Universities and third University in Nigeria in the first ever Open Educational Resources (OER) conducted by National Universities Commission (NUC) Institutional repository.

Criticism
Upon the establishment of Edo State University, Uzairue, the Governor of Edo State Adams Oshiomole was criticized by some section of the press. Francis Akhigbe of THISDAYLive cited "personal interest" as the reason why Oshiomole established the university . The media also felt there was no need of establishing a university when other tertiary institutions in the state were already in bad conditions.

Vice chancellors 

 Emmanuel Aluyor 2016–present is a professor of chemical engineering

References

External links

2016 establishments in Nigeria
Education in Edo State
Universities and colleges in Nigeria
Educational institutions established in 2016
Public universities in Nigeria